Video game art is a specialized form of computer art employing video games as the artistic medium. Video game art often involves the use of patched or modified video games or the repurposing of existing games or game structures, however it relies on a broader range of artistic techniques and outcomes than artistic modification and it may also include painting, sculpture, appropriation, in-game intervention and performance, sampling, etc. It may also include the creation of art games either from scratch or by modifying existing games. Notable examples of video game art include Cory Arcangel's Super Mario Clouds and I Shot Andy Warhol, Joseph Delappe's projects including "Dead in Iraq" and the "Salt Satyagraha Online: Gandhi's March to Dandi in Second Life," the 2004-2005 Rhizome Commissions "relating to the theme of games," Paolo Pedercini's Molleindustria games such as "Unmanned" and "Every Day the Same Dream", and Ian Bogost's "Cowclicker."

Artistic modifications are frequently made possible through the use of level editors, though other techniques exist. Some artists make use of machinima applications to produce non-interactive animated artworks, however artistic modification is not synonymous with machinima as these form only a small proportion of artistic modifications. Machinima is distinct from art mods as it relies on different tools, though there are many similarities with some art mods.

Like video games, artistic game modifications are often interactive and may allow for single-player or multiplayer experience. Multiplayer works make use of networked environments to develop new kinds of interaction and collaborative art production.

Techniques

Machinima

Machinima is the use of real-time three-dimensional (3-D) graphics rendering engines to generate computer animation. The term also refers to works that incorporate this animation technique.

In-game intervention and performance
Artists may intervene in online games in a non-play manner, often disrupting games in progress in order to challenge or expose underlying conventions and functions of game play. Examples of this include Anne Marie Schleiner's Velvet-Strike (a project designed to allow players of realistic first person shooter games to use anti-war graffiti within the game to make an artistic statement) and Dead in Iraq (an art project created by Joseph DeLappe in which the player character purposely allows himself to be shot and then recites the names of US soldiers who have died in the Iraq War).

Site-specific installations and site-relative mods
Site-specific installations and site-relative gaming modifications ("mods"), replicate real-world places (often the art gallery in which they are displayed) to explore similarities and differences between real and virtual worlds. An example is What It Is Without the Hand That Wields It, where blood from kills in Counterstrike manifests and spills into a real life gallery.

Real-time performance instruments
Video games can be incorporated into live audio and visual performance using a variety of instruments and computers such as electronic keyboards embedded with music chips. See also chiptune and the Fijuu project.

Generative art mods
Generative art mods exploit the real-time capabilities of game technologies to produce ever-renewing autonomous artworks. Examples include Julian Oliver's ioq3apaint, a generative painting system that uses the actions of software agents in combat to drive the painting process, Alison Mealy's UnrealArt which takes the movements of game entities and uses them to control a drawing process in an external program, Kent Sheely's "Cities in Flux," a Grand Theft Auto: San Andreas mod that glitches and distorts the game's world in real-time, and RetroYou's R/C Racer a modification of the graphic elements of a racing game which results in rich fields of colour and shape.

See also
 Art game
 Demoscene
 Digital art
 Electronic art
 Electronic Language International Festival
 Game Masters
 Game studies
 Interactive art
 Internet art
 In-game photography
 Mod (video gaming)
 Software art
 Virtual art

Notes

Sources
 GameScenes: Art in the Age of Videogames. (Johan & Levi, 2006). Edited by Matteo Bittanti and Domenico Quaranta.
 
 Videogames and Art by Andy Clarke and Grethe Mitchell (eds.)
 Journal of Media Practice vol 7, no. 1  (special edition on videogames and art) by Andy Clarke and Grethe Mitchell (eds.)
 Switch, Art & Games issue, 1999, online magazine of the CADRE Laboratory for New Media, San Jose State University
 From "First-Person Shooter" to Multi-User Knowledge Spaces Mathias Fuchs and Sylvia Eckermann
 Konsum Art-Server nTRACKER Margarete Jahrmann and Max Moswitzer
 Messages For A First Person Perspective Maia Engeli

External links
 Art games archive with examples of artistic modifications
 Art games website with various examples of artistic modifications
 Art games archive with examples of artistic modifications

 
Visual arts genres
Digital art
Works based on video games
Modern art